The 8th Indie Series Awards were held on April 5, 2017 at The Colony Theatre in Los Angeles, with the ceremony hosted by EastSiders producers and stars Kit Williamson and John Halbach. Presented by We Love Soaps, the awards recognize independently produced, scripted entertainment created for the web.

In January 2017, it was announced that the number of nominees for the Best Web Series Drama and Comedy awards would be increased from six to eight in each category. The nominees were announced on February 1, 2017. The Bay led with 21 nominations, followed by The Amazing Gayl Pile with 16, both of which broke the previous record of 13 nominations.

Awards
The awards were given on April 5, 2017. Winners are listed first and highlighted in boldface:

References

External links

 Indie Series Awards History and Archive of Past Winners

Indie Series Awards
2017 film awards